USS Logic (AM-258) was an Admirable-class minesweeper built for the U.S. Navy during World War II. Built to clear minefields in offshore waters, she served the Navy in the Atlantic Ocean.

Logic was laid down by American Shipbuilding Co., Lorain, Ohio, 27 October 1942; launched 10 April 1943; sponsored by Lt. (jg.) Mary Erbenz, USCGR; and commissioned 21 November.

World War II North Atlantic operations
After a cruise through the Great Lakes, Logic engaged in shakedown exercises in Chesapeake Bay. Departing Little Creek, Virginia, 25 January 1944, the minesweeper sailed for South America, arriving Recife, Brazil, 4 March. For the next 12 months Logic operated out of Recife with Mine Division 31, sweeping the main shipping channels of South American ports. She also escorted convoys from Brazil to Trinidad, patrolled the harbor, and engaged in antisubmarine training.

Arriving Miami, Florida, 12 March 1945, Logic received an extensive overhaul before resuming minesweeping exercises in June. Throughout the summer, she operated along the U.S. East Coast, returning to Miami 15 August.

Decommissioning
Logic was transferred to the Republic of China under the lend-lease program 28 August 1945 as Yung Shun (AM 44) and was reclassified A-28.  She was decommissioned and struck 1 June 1970. Fate is unknown.

References

External links
 Dictionary of American Naval Fighting Ships: Logic
 NavSource Online: Mine Warfare Vessel Photo Archive - Logic (AM 258)

Admirable-class minesweepers
Ships built in Lorain, Ohio
1943 ships
World War II minesweepers of the United States
Admirable-class minesweepers of the Republic of China Navy